Ponnambalam or Ponnampalam is a Tamil male given name. Due to the Tamil tradition of using patronymic surnames it may also be a surname for males and females.

Given name
 Ponnambalam (actor) (born 1963), Indian actor
 A. Ponnambalam (1814–1887), Ceylonese colonial-era government functionary
 Cathiravelu Ponnambalam, Ceylonese politician
 G. G. Ponnambalam (1901–1977), Ceylonese politician and lawyer
 V. Ponnambalam (1930–1994), Sri Lankan politician and teacher

Surname
 Gajendrakumar Ponnambalam (born 1974), Sri Lankan politician
 Kaarthigesar Ponnambalam Ratnam (1914–2010), Ceylonese politician and academic
 Kumar Ponnambalam (1938–2000), Sri Lankan politician and lawyer
 Ponnambalam Arunachalam (1853–1924), Ceylonese statesman
 Ponnambalam Kandiah (1914–1960), Ceylonese politician
 Ponnambalam Kumaraswamy (1930–1988), Indian hydrologist
 Ponnambalam Nagalingam, Ceylonese politician
 Ponnambalam Ramanathan (1851–1930), Ceylonese politician
 Ponnambalam Selvarasa (born 1946), Sri Lankan politician
 Satchi Ponnambalam (1935–1999), Sri Lankan lawyer and judge

Tamil masculine given names